Oskar Leimgruber (5 July 1886 in Fribourg, Switzerland – 19 July 1976) was a Swiss Politician from the Christian Democratic People's Party (CVP).

After having studied at Fribourg and at Schwytz, he pursued legal studies at the Universities of Fribourg, Bern, and Vienna, obtaining his doctorate in 1911.

Leimgruber had many different jobs, among them journalist at La Liberté and at Freiburger Zeitung, adjunct director of the museum of arts and occupations, and cantonal secretary of arts and occupations, as well as lawyer.

In 1912, he became a jurist for Swiss Federal Railways and also at Bern. In 1919, he became simultaneously member of the central committee of the CVP and secretary of the federal department of the postal services and railways, where he worked as general secretary. Named Vice-Chancellor in 1925, he created the Federal printed matter and materials center. Leimgruber represented Switzerland at numerous international conferences.

In 1923 he founded the International SME Union as well as the International Management Institute in Brussels, over which he presided. He has written extensively on issues of the economy, administration, sociology and jurisprudence.

In 1934 Leimgruber was defeated by Bovet in a close election for a new Federal Chancellor. However, nine years later he was elected to the post. He was the first Chancellor belonging to the Catholic Conservatives. Leimgruber introduced simultaneous translation of speeches in the National Council. For the centenary in 1948, he was the co-editor of the book Emblem, seals and constitutions of the Swiss Confederation and the cantons and Adjusted collection of federal laws and regulations from 1848 to 1947. He resigned in 1951 and died in Bern in 1976.

References

External links
 
 

Federal Chancellors of Switzerland
1886 births
1976 deaths
20th-century Swiss politicians
People from Fribourg